Joseon missions to the Ryukyu Kingdom were diplomatic and trade ventures of the Joseon dynasty that were intermittently sent after 1392. These diplomatic contacts were within the Sinocentric system of bilateral and multinational relationships in East Asia. The Ryukyuan King Satto established formal relations with the Joseon court.

In 1392, the envoy from the Ryukyu Kingdom to the court of the Goryeo monarch became among the first foreign representatives to appear in the court of the new king of what would be called the Joseon dynasty. In this period, the historic, political, and diplomatic material for research on relations with Ryukyu are encompassed within the Annals of the Joseon Dynasty (Joseon Wangjo Sillok). The first Joseon diplomatic embassy at the Ryukyuan court in 1392 was followed by a second one in 1393.

These reciprocal diplomatic and trade relations continue uninterrupted until the war years of 1592–1598; and they were restored after the end of the Imjin War.

See also 
 Ryukyuan missions to Edo
 Joseon missions to Imperial China
 Joseon missions to Japan
 List of monarchs of the Ryukyu Islands
 Imperial Chinese missions to the Ryukyu Kingdom

References

Citations

Sources 
 Kerr, George H. (1965). Okinawa, the History of an Island People. Rutland, Vermont: C.E. Tuttle Co. OCLC 39242121
 Toby, Ronald P. (1991).  State and Diplomacy in Early Modern Japan: Asia in the Development of the Tokugawa Bakufu. Stanford: Stanford University Press. ; OCLC 246640133

Further reading
 Okamoto Hiromichi,  "Structural Transformation of Ryukyu Kingdom in the 17th and Early 18th Centuries: As an Intersection of Cultural Interaction." 
 Kobata, Atsushi and Mitsugu Matsuda. (1969). Ryukyuan Relations with Korea and South Sea Countries; an Annotated Translation of Documents in the Rekidai Hōan. Kyoto:     . OCLC 221947347

Publisher:	Kyoto, Japan, Author, 7 Sennyuji-tōrinchō, Higashiyamaku, 1969.
Edition/Format:	 Book : EnglishView all editions and formats
Rating:	
(not yet rated) 0 with reviews – Be the first.

Foreign relations of the Ryukyu Kingdom
Foreign relations of the Joseon dynasty